Geatnjajávri is a lake in Berlevåg Municipality in Troms og Finnmark county, Norway. The lake is located just north of the border with Tana Municipality, along the road between the villages of Berlevåg and Båtsfjord. The Norwegian County Road 890 crosses over the lake on a causeway and bridge on the western side of the lake. The lake has a dam on the northern end and the water eventually flows out into the river Kongsfjordelva.

See also
List of lakes in Norway

References

Berlevåg
Reservoirs in Norway
Lakes of Troms og Finnmark